The pound (sign: £) was the currency of Nova Scotia until 1860. It was subdivided into 20 shillings (sign: s or /–), each of 12 pence (sign: d). It was equivalent to sterling and was replaced by the dollar in 1860, at a rate of $5 dollars = £1 ($1 = 4/–), although coins and notes of the dollar currency were not issued until 1861.

Tokens
In addition to British coins, copper tokens were issued in 1823 and 1856 in denominations of ½d and 1d.

Banknotes
In 1812, the Provincial Government introduced Treasury notes in denominations of £1, £2½, £5 and £50. Between 1813 and 1830, notes for £1, £2 and £5 were issued. 5/– and 10/– notes were added in 1830. Along with the Treasury notes, two chartered banks issued paper money in Nova Scotia, the Bank of Nova Scotia, and the Halifax Banking Company. The Halifax Banking Company issued notes from 1825, in denominations of £1½, £5, £6, £6½ and £7, whilst the Bank of Nova Scotia began issuing notes in 1834, with denominations of £1½, £2, £2½, £5¼, £6, £7, £7½ and £10.

See also

 Nova Scotian dollar

References

External links

Currencies of Canada
Modern obsolete currencies
1860 disestablishments
Economy of Nova Scotia